The 1914 Detroit Heralds season was the 10th season for the Detroit Heralds, an independent American football team. Led by coach Bill Marshall, the team compiled an 8–0–1 record, shut out eight opponents, and allowed only six points during the season. After the season ended, sports writer E. A. Batchelor declared the Heralds to be the state's independent football champion and branded coach Marshall "a real football genius".

Having gone undefeated in 1913 as well, the Heralds' 1914 season extended the team's unbeaten streak to 16 games. In addition to facing opponents from within the state, the 1914 Heralds also played an Illinois team (Evanston North Ends) to a scoreless tie and defeated one Canadian team and three Ohio teams: Windsor (33–0); Cleveland Erin Braus (13–0); Cincinnati Celts (13–0); and Massillon Tigers (19–0).

Schedule

Players
The team's players included the following, those players with at least four starts shown in bold:
 Pat Dunne - started 7 games at fullback, 1 game at end
 Ell (?) - started 2 games at fullback, 1 game at guard
 Hurley - started 1 game at end
 King - started 1 game at guard
 Latham - started 3 games at quarterback
 Birtie Maher - started all 9 games at halfback
 Mitchell - started 6 games at guard
 Moran - started 4 games at guard
 Mouat - started 1 game at halfback
 Lawrence Nadeau - started 8 games at end
 H. Schlee - started 8 games at tackle
 G. Shields - started all 9 games at tackle
 R. "Dick" Shields - started all 9 games at end; also team captain
 Archie "Dutch" Stewart - started 8 games at center
 Wayne - started 6 games at guard
 "Hubby" Weekes - started 5 games at quarterback (previously a star at Eastern High School)
 Percy Wilson - started 7 games at halfback, 1 game at quarterback

References 

Detroit Heralds seasons
Detroit Heralds